Kwatay (Kuwaataay) is a divergent Jola language of Senegal.

The Diembereng dialect is spoken on a southern coastal island of the same name, located in the Casamance River delta. A person is referred to as a-jɛmbɛrɛŋ or a-waat, and people are referred to as ɛ-waat. Their territory is known as juwaat. The language is called ɛlɔp ɛjɛmbɛrɛŋay and bahamin buwaatay, where ɛlɔp and presumably bahamin mean 'language'.

References

Jola languages
Languages of Senegal